Marie Oteiza (born 30 January 1994) is a French modern pentathlete.

She participated at the 2018 World Modern Pentathlon Championships, winning a medal.

References

External links

Living people
1994 births
French female modern pentathletes
World Modern Pentathlon Championships medalists
Sportspeople from Landes (department)
Modern pentathletes at the 2020 Summer Olympics
People from Mont-de-Marsan
Olympic modern pentathletes of France